Mnemonics are used by aircraft pilots for the safe management of a flight.

List of mnemonics

 ANDS (in the Northern hemisphere) - Accelerate North Decelerate South. SAND in the Southern hemisphere.
BLITTS - pre-takeoff checks
BUMMMFITCHH - pre-landing checks
CBSIFTBEC - Canadian glider pre-takeoff checks
CIGAR - pre-takeoff checks
CISTRSC - UK glider pre-takeoff checks
CRAFT - instrument flight rules clearance checks
FATPL - pre-takeoff checks. Fuel, Altimeters, Transponder, Pitot Heat, Landing Light.
FREDA - en-route checks
GUMPS - pre-landing checks
HASELL - checks before aerial manoeuvres
IMSAFE - personal wellness checks
OWLS - checks to assess an unprepared surface for a precautionary landing
PARE - spin recovery technique
 TMPFFGH - Trim, Mixture, Pitch, Fuel, Flaps, Engine Air Ventilation, Hydraulic Pressure. Avro Lancaster pre-takeoff checks.
 UNOS (in the Northern hemisphere) - Undershoot North, Overshoot South. To compensate for magnetic dip when turning. ONUS in the Southern hemisphere.
 UPRT - upset recovery technique

See also
List of aviation, avionics, aerospace and aeronautical abbreviations
Pilot decision making § Mnemonics

References